Second Hand Rose is a 1922 American drama film directed by Lloyd Ingraham and written by A. P. Younger. The film stars Gladys Walton, George B. Williams, A. Edward Sutherland, Wade Boteler, Max Davidson, and Virginia Adair. The film was released on May 8, 1922, by Universal Film Manufacturing Company.

Plot
As described in a film magazine, Rose O'Grady (Walton), an Irish waif, is adopted by kindhearted Hebrew pawnbroker Isaac Rosenstein (Williams), and, when Mama Rosenstein dies, Rose assumes the duties of housekeeper. Son Nat Rosenstein, employed  in a silk factory, is robbed of some waybills and is sentenced to jail. He is released from jail through the political influence of Tim McCarthy (Perry), who wants to marry Rose. Nat aids the police in catching other crooks, and Rose confesses her love for Terry O'Brien (Dougherty), who takes Rose away from the secondhand store and secondhand family.

Cast           
Gladys Walton as Rose O'Grady
George B. Williams as Isaac Rosenstein
A. Edward Sutherland as Nat Rosenstein 
Wade Boteler as Frankie 'Bull' Thompson
Max Davidson as Abe Rosenstein
Virginia Adair as Rebecca Rosenstein
Alice Belcher as Rachel Rosenstein
Jack Dougherty as Terry O'Brien
Walter Perry as Tim McCarthy
Bennett Southard as Hawkins
Camilla Clark as Little Rosie
Marion Feducha as Little Nat

References

External links

1922 films
1920s English-language films
Silent American drama films
1922 drama films
Universal Pictures films
Films directed by Lloyd Ingraham
American silent feature films
American black-and-white films
1920s American films